Jochen Alexander Freydank is a German film director. Freydank has directed feature films, TV movies, commercials and stage plays, and won various awards, including an Academy Award for his short film Toyland in 2009.

Jochen Alexander Freydank was born in 1967 in East Berlin. He started his career in the 1990s as an editor and assistant director for television and film productions. He is also known as a screenwriter for television series and TV movies and worked as a producer. He produced one of Germany's most successful TV series. In 1999 he founded his film production company, Mephisto Film.

Freydank's first short film was the macabre comedy Happy End, followed by the short film Emergency. In 2002, he wrote and directed Duty, which had its world premiere at the Montreal World Film Festival. Freydank then directed, co-wrote and produced the short film Toyland, which won more than 30 international awards. In February 2009 TOYLAND won the Oscar for best live-action short film.

Freydank's directorial credits include feature films and TV movies, among them Homefront, Allmächtig, Tatort, and the tragicomedy Und Weg Bist Du, which won the best director award at Bayerischer Fernsehpreis. In 2010 Freydank directed the stage play Johnny Chicago at Berliner Volksbühne. In 2013/2014 he wrote, directed and produced the feature film Kafka's The Burrow based on a novel by Franz Kafka. The film had its world premiere at the Busan International Film Festival and its European premiere at the Warsaw International Film Festival. 2014 Freydank wrote and directed Grosse Fische – Kleine Fische, followed by three prime-time movies for German TV in 2015: Der Wilde Sven, the thriller Zorn – Wie Sie Töten and Engelmacher, a police crime drama. In 2016 he directed the TV movies Dünnes Eis and Trugspur. He then directed two German TV movies in Barcelona, Spain: Über Wasser Halten and Tod Aus Der Tiefe, and in 2017 a thriller based on the best selling novel Das Joshua Profil by Sebastian Fitzek. In 2020 he directed another literary adaptation: Zero is a dark social media thriller based on the bestselling novel  by Marc Elsberg starring Heike Makatsch. 

Freydank is a member of the Academy of Motion Picture Arts and Sciences.

Filmography as director 

 2021: Herzogpark (miniseries)
 2021: Zero
 2020: Du sollst nicht luegen (miniseries)
 2019: Dein Leben gehoert mir
 2018: Das Joshua Profil
 2017: Tod aus der Tiefe
 2017: Über Wasser halten
 2016: Trugspur
 2016: Polizeiruf 110: Dünnes Eis
 2015: Zorn – Wie sie töten
 2015: Der wilde Sven
 2015: Engelmacher
 2014: Grosse Fische – Kleine Fische 
 2014: Kafka's The Burrow 
 2013: Tatort: Allmächtig 
 2012: Und weg bist du 
 2010: Tatort: Heimatfront (Homefront)
 2007: Toyland (Spielzeugland)
 2002: Duty (Dienst)
 2001: Emergency (Notfall)
 1999: Happy End (Glückliches Ende)

Theatre 
 2010: Johnny Chicago (Berliner Volksbühne)

Filmography as producer 
 2014: Kafka's The Burrow
 2007–2009: In aller Freundschaft
 2007: Endlich Samstag!
 2007: Toyland (Spielzeugland)
 2002: One Single Moment 
 2002: Duty (Dienst)
 2002: The Last Journey 
 2001: Emergency (Notfall)
 1999: Happy End (Glückliches Ende)

Filmography as writer 
 2015: Grosse Fische – Kleine Fische 
 2014: Kafka's The Burrow 
 2008: Polizeiruf 110 – Taximord 
 2007: Toyland 
 2003: Medicopter 117 – Jedes Leben zählt  
 2002: Duty (Dienst)
 2001: Klinikum Berlin Mitte – Leben in Bereitschaft
 2001: Emergency (Notfall)
 1999: Happy End (Glückliches Ende)

Awards

2021
 Jupiter Award, nomination "Du sollst nicht lügen" best series
 Bayerischer Fernsehpreis, nomination Barry Atsma, best actor "Du sollst nicht lügen"
 Hessischer Fernsehpreis, nomination Felicitas Woll, best actress "Du sollst nicht lügen"

2020
 Jupiter Award, nomination Vladimir Burlakov, best actor "Dein Leben gehört mir"

2015
 Edinburgh International Film Festival, nomination for "Kafka's the Burrow"
 Shanghai International Film Festival, nomination for "Kafka's the Burrow"
 Bari International Film Festival, nomination for "Kafka's the Burrow"

2014
 Busan International Film Festival, nomination for "Kafka's the Burrow"
 Warsaw International Film Festival, nomination for "Kafka's the Burrow"

2013
 Bayerischer Fernsehpreis, best director for "Und weg bist du"

2009
 OSCAR live action short film for Toyland
 Phoenix Film Festival, United States, world cinema best short for Toyland
 Anchorage Film Festival, United States, audience award for Toyland
 Washington Jewish Film Festival, United States, audience award for Toyland
 Kansas City Film Fest, United States, best narrative short for Toyland
 Pittsburgh Jewish Film Festival, United States, audience award for Toyland
 Hong Kong Jewish Film Festival, audience award for Toyland
 Rehoboth Film Festival, United States, audience award for Toyland
 Villa Mare Film Festival, Italy, audience award for Toyland
 Reno Film Festival, United States, best foreign film for Toyland
 Portland International Film Festival, United States, audience award (second place) for Toyland
 Lenola Film Festival, Italy, best film + "best Soundtrack" for Toyland
 Shorts at moonlight, Germany, audience award for Toyland
 New Jersey Film Festival, United States, honorable mention for Toyland
 Cleveland International Film Festival, United States, audience award for Toyland
 San Diego Jewish Film Festival, United States, audience award for Toyland

2008
 Short Shorts Film Festival Tokyo, Japan, audience award for Toyland
 Friedrich-Wilhelm-Murnau-Stiftung, Germany short film award for Toyland
 Bermuda International Film Festival, Bermuda Short Film Award for Toyland
 Rhode Island International Film Festival, United States, second place International Discovery Award for Toyland
 Giffoni Film Festival, Italy, APEC Award in gold for Toyland
 Montreal World Film Festival, Canada nomination for "Toyland"
 Alpinale, Austria, audience award, for Toyland
 Odense International Film Festival, Danmark, best children and youth film for Toyland
 Alemeria en Corto, Filmfestival, Spain, jury award & audience award for Toyland
 Los Angeles Jewish Film Festival, United States audience award for Toyland
 Palm Springs International Festival of Short Films, United States, audience award for Toyland
 Sedicicorto – International Film Festival Forli, Italy, Best short film for Toyland
 Asheville Film Festival, United States, Best short film for Toyland
 Victoria Independent Film Festival, Australia, Best short under 20 minutes for Toyland
 Festival Internacional de Cortometrajes de Almería, Spain, audience award- and jury award for Toyland

2007
 Valladolid International Film Festival, Spain, Golden Spike for Toyland

2004
 Montecatini Film Festival, Italy, best film International Panorama for "Duty"

2003
 Rüsselsheimer Kurzfilmtage, special award for "Duty"
 Montreal World Film Festival, Canada nomination for "Duty"
 Fantastisk Filmfestival Malmö, Sweden, nomination for best European short film for "Duty"

2002
 Audience award, Spotlight, internationales TV- und Werbefilm Festival for Hanfstreu
 Cindy Award in Gold by the Association of Audio Visual Communicators for Hanfstreu
 Silberner Bär, Festival der Nationen, Austria for Emergency
 Corto web award, Arcipelago FIlm Festival, Rome, Italy for Emergency

2001
 Kommunikationsverband: "Die Klappe in Bronze", for Hanfstreu
 Audience award at the online film festival "Shorts welcome" for Happy End (Glückliches Ende)

References

External links 
 
 
 Jochen Alexander Freydank bei crew united
 Berliner Spaziergang: Der Geschichtenerzähler, Berliner Morgenpost, 17 May 2009
 Der deutsche Oscargewinner, Die Welt, 23 February 2009
 , Oscar Gewinner Jochen Alexander Freydak DW, 5 July 2009
 Ich unterstelle mir schon Talent, Frankfurter Allgemeine, 6. März 2009
 Mephisto Film

Directors of Live Action Short Film Academy Award winners
German-language film directors
Living people
Film directors from Berlin
1967 births
German television directors